Alfred Pelenise (born 14 November 1982), also known as Afeleki, is a former New Zealand rugby union player who played for the New Zealand Sevens team and Professional Rugby for Castres Olympique and FC Grenoble in France.

Career highlights
New Zealand Sevens 2005–2008
New Zealand Under 19s 2001
New Zealand Under 21s 2002, 2003
Canterbury 2005, 2006
Tasman 2007 - 2010
Castres Olympique 2008 - 2009
FC Grenoble 2011 - 2012
IRB Sevens Player of the Year 2007

References

External links 
 
 

1982 births
World Rugby Awards winners
Living people
New Zealand rugby union players
Rugby union players from Christchurch